Hobardzi, is a village (rural community) in the Lori Province of Armenia.

It is about 11 km south-east of Stepanavan (about 20 minutes by car) and is close to the villages of Vardablur and Gyulagarak. The Stepanavan Dendropark is located about 3 km south-west of Hobardzi (about a 1-hour walk).

Nearby communities

Nearby towns
 Stepanavan

Nearby villages
 Gyulagarak
 Vardablur
 Kurtan
 Gargar

References
 (as Opartsi)

Populated places in Lori Province